Achanur  is a village in the southern state of Karnataka, India. It is located in the Bagalkot taluk of Bagalkot district in Karnataka.

See also
Bagalkot
Districts of Karnataka

Achanur is around 20 Kilometers from Bagalkot Town.

Annual Programs in Temple

From :Yugadi padya (ಯುಗಾದಿ ಪಾಡ್ಯ) to Hanum Jayanti : Daily 'special Pooja' and Anna prasad.

On the day of 'Hanum Jayanti' : Pavamana Homa (ಹೋಮಾ), Satyanarayan Pooja and Rathotsava.

References

External links
http://Bagalkot.nic.in/

Villages in Bagalkot district